Berkeley College is a private for-profit college with campuses in New York, New Jersey, and online.  It was founded in 1931 and offers undergraduate and graduate degrees and certificate programs. Berkeley College is accredited by the Middle States Commission on Higher Education.  There is no association between Berkeley College and The University of California, Berkeley.

Academics
Berkeley College offers certificate,  associate's, bachelor's, and graduate degree programs. The College serves a diverse student body of more than 3,600 students through The Larry L. Luing School of Business,  School of Professional Studies, and School of Health Studies, on-site and online. 

Berkeley College launched its first graduate degree program, a Master of Business Administration (M.B.A.), in 2015. Through Berkeley College's Corporate Learning Partnership, the M.B.A. program partners with organizations like Affinity Federal Credit Union to offer master's degree and continuing education programs to employees.  Berkeley College launched an M.B.A. through the College's Larry L. Luing School of Business in Manhattan, NY, that was offered on-site at the Midtown Manhattan campus beginning in April 2022. 

Berkeley College announced the launch of a Master of Science in Nursing program through its School of Health Studies in December 2021. The advanced degree has specialized concentrations in Nursing Leadership and Management, Nursing Education, Family Nurse Practitioner, and Public Health and Emergency Management Nursing. With this program approval, Berkeley College – New Jersey has the only Licensed Practical Nurse-Bachelor of Science in Nursing-Master of Science in Nursing (LPN-BSN-MSN) pathway program in the State of New Jersey.

U.S. News & World Report has recognized Berkeley College among the Best Online Bachelor's Degree Programs and the Best Online Bachelor's Degree Programs for Veterans for 10 consecutive years. In 2023, Berkeley College was also recognized in the categories Best Online Bachelor's Degree Programs - Business and Best Online MBA Programs. Berkeley has been offering distance education courses since 1998.

Campuses
The college has a New York City Campus in Midtown Manhattan, and three campuses in New Jersey (Newark, Woodbridge, and Woodland Park). Berkeley announced the closure of the White Plains campus in fall 2021 and consolidated it with its Manhattan campus. Berkeley announced the closure of the Paramus campus in spring 2022 and consolidated it with its Woodland Park campus. 

In 2014, the Berkeley College Extension Center at 130 Williams Street New York, NY was closed. Two years later, the college closed the Clifton campus (600 Getty Avenue Clifton, NJ),. In 2018 the Dover campus was closed with the Brooklyn campus closed the following year.

Legal issues 
In 2015, Berkeley College was named in a New York City Consumer Agency investigation (along with 3 other for-profit schools) concerning student dropout and loan default rates, as well as how the college recruits new students.

In 2018, Berkeley College was named in a lawsuit filed by the New York Department of Consumer Affairs for deceptive and predatory practices. The lawsuit description includes (1) misleading students about financial aid, including federal financial aid; (2) tricking students into taking out loans directly from Berkeley College; (3) deceiving students about institutional grants; (4) deceiving students about transfer credits, majors, and careers; and (5) violating local debt collection laws by concealing its identity from former students when collecting debt, including debt that is not owed. Berkeley College denied the allegations contained in the DCA's lawsuit and denied that it violated the New York City Consumer Protection Law.

In 2019, Berkeley College was sued by former staffers at the White Plains (NY) campus claiming they faced "a gender-related hostile work environment" and "wrongful termination." However, plaintiffs failed to prove their case. In July 2021, the Southern District of New York granted defendants' motion for summary judgment and dismissed the lawsuit against Berkeley College and all individual defendants. Thereafter, plaintiffs appealed their loss, and, in November 2022, the U.S. Court of Appeals for the 2nd Circuit affirmed the judgment of the SDNY.

In 2022, the NYC Department of Consumer and Worker Protection (DCWP) reached a settlement with Berkeley College in connection with DCWP’s 2018 lawsuit.  The settlement requires Berkeley to, among other things, stop collection on any outstanding debt incurred before January 1, 2019, which Berkeley estimates is valued at a total of $20 million; pay $350,000 to the City, which DCWP plans to use to pay restitution to certain impacted consumers; and instruct its third-party debt collectors to request that credit reporting agencies remove all consumer account information related to student debt owed to Berkeley incurred before January 1, 2019.

Athletics

Berkeley College Knights Athletics includes Basketball and Soccer teams. They compete in the USCAA and the Hudson Valley Intercollegiate Athletic Conference.

Notable alumni 

 Monique Chandler-Waterman
 Danielle Rose Russell

Notable faculty 
 Monique Holsey-Hyman

References

External links

 

Educational institutions established in 1931
Universities and colleges in Newark, New Jersey
Private universities and colleges in New York City
USCAA member institutions
Universities and colleges in Bergen County, New Jersey
1931 establishments in the United States